The Hong Kong Council of the Church of Christ in China (Abbr: HKCCCC) is a Protestant Christian church organization in Hong Kong. Its history can be traced back to the formation of the Church of Christ in China, which is a uniting church consisting mainly of churches with Congregational and Presbyterian traditions (reformed traditions), including the London Missionary Society, British Baptist Missionary Society and others.

Initially established as the Sixth District Association of the Guangdong Synod of the Church of Christ in China, the Hong Kong Council was reorganized from its predecessor in 1953 after the Chinese Communist Party took over mainland China, because their connection with the Guangdong Synod cannot be maintained due to the political situation.

The construction of their first church building, was completed on 10 October 1926. It is located at 2 Bonham Road in the Mid-Levels area in the city.

See also 

 Church of Christ in China
 Christianity in Hong Kong

References

External links

The official website 

 
Christian organizations established in 1953
Protestant churches in Hong Kong
Members of the World Council of Churches
Christian denominations in Asia
Members of the World Communion of Reformed Churches